François-Joseph Grille (29 December 1792, Angers – 5 December 1853, aged 70) was a 19th-century French man of letters, journalist and politician.

Biography 
François-Joseph was the son of F. Grille and Madeleine-Marthe Fillon du Pin, and the nephew of Toussaint Grille (1766–1850) who was director of the municipal library of Angers in 1805.

From 1807 to 1830, he held several posts in the Interior Ministry. In 1814 he was appointed head of the 3rd Division, Science and Fine Arts of the Ministry. In 1838 he was librarian of the city of Angers

During the French Revolution of 1848, he was appointed Commissioner of the Provisional Government, and prefect of Vendée 30 March 1848 and dismissed in October.

Work 
Francois-Joseph Grille a écrit sous son nom, en utilisant l'anonymat et aussi de nombreux pseudonymes among others Malvoisine and Hélyon Champ-Charles il rédige de nombreux épîtres

In 1840, he published L'émigration Angevine, a collection of rare materials on families and gentlemen from Anjou, during the French Emigration, written by a médecin d'émigrés, the manuscript was acquired by his uncle Toussaint Grille, the librarian of Angers and entrusted in 1833 to precfet Gauja

Bibliography 
 Épître à M. Quérard, Paris : Ledoyen, 1853
 Description du département du Nord, 1825-1830
 Introduction aux mémoires sur la Révolution française, ou, Tableau comparatif des mandats et pouvoirs donnés par les provinces à leurs députés aux états-généraux de 1789, Volume 2
1853: Le bric-à-brac : avec son catalogue raisonné,
 L'émigration Angevine, Cosnier et Lachèse, Bibliothèque des archives du Maine et Loire, Cote BIB 527, 1840
 La Fleur des pois : Carnot et Robespierre, amis et ennemis, capilotade historique, poétique, drolatique, dédiée aux bouquinistes
 Miettes littéraires, biographiques et morales, livrées au public, avec des explications. 1853
 La Vendée en 1793, Paris, Chamerot, 1851-52

References

External links 
 François-Joseph Grille on data.bnf.fr
 François-Joseph Grille on Wikisource

1782 births
People from Angers
1853 deaths
French librarians